Knyphausen may refer to:

Edzard zu Innhausen und Knyphausen (1827–1908), Frisian and Prussian landowner and politician
Dodo zu Innhausen und Knyphausen (1583–1636), Field Marshal of Sweden
Dodo von Knyphausen (1641–1698), official of Brandenburg-Prussia
Wilhelm von Knyphausen (1716–1800), Hessian general in the American Revolutionary War